Ice Gate Glacier is a narrow hanging glacier, tributary to Astudillo Glacier, between rock spurs on the west slope of Dallmeyer Peak, Danco Coast, Antarctica. It was named by the Polish Antarctic Expedition in about 1992, probably from the gatelike appearance of the spurs at the junction of the two glaciers.

See also
 List of glaciers in the Antarctic
 Glaciology

References

Poland and the Antarctic
Glaciers of Danco Coast